Bedlno  is a village in Kutno County, Łódź Voivodeship, in central Poland. It is the seat of the gmina (administrative district) called Gmina Bedlno.

The village has a population of 640.

References

Villages in Kutno County
Warsaw Governorate
Łódź Voivodeship (1919–1939)